The Iraq Freedom Congress (or Iraqi Freedom Congress, IFC) is a libertarian socialist, progressive, democratic, and secularist group.  The Congress was formed in March 2005 by labor groups, women's groups, students, and neighborhood groups concerned about sectarian violence, Ba'athism, Islamism, and nationalism, as well as the post-war occupation.

The Congress has been active in protests, most recently regarding post-occupation security and checkpoint policy.

External links
 Official web site

References

2005 establishments in Iraq
Iraqi democracy movements
Libertarian socialist organizations
National liberation movements
Occupation of Iraq
Political movements in Iraq
Religion and violence
Secularism in Iraq
Socialism in Iraq